Candidatus Phytoplasma sacchari is a species of phytoplasma pathogen associated with sugarcane grassy shoot disease (SCGS). This SCGS phytoplasma belongs to the Rice Yellow Dwarf (RYD) group.

References

Sugarcane diseases
Candidatus taxa